Hampton Land District is a land district (cadastral division) of Western Australia, located within the Eastern Land Division in the Goldfields region of the state.

Location and features
The district is located in the central Goldfields region, and contains the following towns or former towns:

 Kalgoorlie–Boulder:
 Brown Hill †
 Hannans
 Ivanhoe †
 Lakewood †
 Parkeston
 Somerville
 Trafalgar †
 Balagundi †
 Bardoc †
 Black Flag †
 Boorara †
 Broad Arrow †
 Bulong †
 Feysville †
 Gindalbie †
 Golden Ridge †
 Gordon †
 Gudarra †
 Kanowna †
 Kurnalpi †
 Mulgarrie †
 Ora Banda
 Paddington †
 Windanya †

† — former or ghost town.

History
The district was created on 4 October 1899, and was amended on 12 December 1900. It was described in the Government Gazette thus:

References

Land districts of Western Australia
Goldfields-Esperance